The 1905 Louisiana Industrial football team was an American football team that represented the Louisiana Industrial Institute—now known as Louisiana Tech University—as an independent during the 1905 college football season. In their first and only season under head coach J. U. Bragg, Louisiana Industrial compiled a 0–1 record, losing their only game to LSU in Baton Rouge, Louisiana. The team's captain was J. P. Pope.

Schedule

References

Louisiana Industrial
Louisiana Tech Bulldogs football seasons
College football winless seasons
Louisiana Industrial football